Ligidium gracile is a species of rock slater in the family Ligiidae. It is found in North America.

Subspecies
These two subspecies belong to the species Ligidium gracile:
 Ligidium gracile flavum Jackson, 1923
 Ligidium gracile gracile (Dana, 1856)

References

Isopoda
Articles created by Qbugbot
Crustaceans described in 1856